Philanthus nasalis, commonly known as the Antioch sphecid wasp, is a species of bee-hunting wasp (or "beewolf") originally described from Contra Costa County, California.

References 

Crabronidae
Hymenoptera of North America
Insects described in 1972